SSCAC may refer to:
South Side Community Art Center, Chicago, United States
Suzhou Culture and Arts Centre, Suzhou, China (formerly known as Suzhou Science and Culture Arts Centre)